This is a complete list of episodes of Scariest Places on Earth, an American paranormal documentary reality television series that originally aired from October 23, 2000 to October 29, 2006 on Fox Family. Hosted by actress Linda Blair, the series visited a wide array of reportedly haunted locations around the world, giving historical context, interviews, and reality TV-style segments featuring people staying overnight in the locations.

Series overview

Episodes

Season 1

Season 2

Season 3

Season 4

Season 5

Notes

References

Lists of American non-fiction television series episodes